The Augustine Hansell House, also known as Jeffries House, is a historic home of exceptional quality in Thomasville, Georgia, United States.  It was designed by architect John Wind, the leading architect of Thomas County, in Greek Revival style.  A -story cottage, it was built during 1852–53 for Augustine Hansell.  Hansell, who later (1869) was mayor of Thomasville, was a judge of the Superior Court of the Southern Judicial Circuit.  He also organized the Thomas Reserves and was commander of a militia company of Thomas County.  He was a lieutenant in the Thomas Reserves.

The house is a -story wood-frame cottage, with the main house having four rooms in a center-hall plan.  It has an overhanging portico supported by six square columns.  It has two small windows centered in the gable front.

Its interior is little-altered from the original and has Greek Revival details in its doorways, stairway, and four fireplaces with carved mantels.

The addition of wings for a kitchen and a bedroom in 1927 did not detract from the architectural character of the house.

It was listed on the National Register of Historic Places in 1970.

Up to 1969 the house had remained in the same family and was then owned by a granddaughter of Augustine Hansell.  It has been described as one of the "three best cottages" in Thomasville.

References

1852 establishments in Georgia (U.S. state)
Greek Revival houses in Georgia (U.S. state)
Houses completed in 1852
Houses in Thomas County, Georgia
Houses on the National Register of Historic Places in Georgia (U.S. state)
National Register of Historic Places in Thomas County, Georgia